is a Japanese voice actress and singer from Shizuoka Prefecture who is affiliated with . She is known for her roles as Ririko Oribe in Sakura Quest and Rina Tennoji in Love Live! Nijigasaki High School Idol Club.

Career
Tanaka was inspired to pursue a voice acting career after seeing the anime television series Macross Frontier. She enrolled at a voice acting school operated by the talent agency Sigma Seven, and after finishing her training, formally became affiliated with them in 2015. In 2016, she played Sasame Tsuji in Three Leaves, Three Colors. The following year, she played her first major role as Ririko Oribe in Sakura Quest. That same year, she was cast as Rina Tennoji in the mobile game Love Live! School Idol Festival All Stars, later reprising the role in the anime series Love Live! Nijigasaki High School Idol Club.

In 2021, Tanaka formed the music duo Nacherry with fellow Love Live! cast member Natsumi Murakami.

Filmography

Anime
2016
Three Leaves, Three Colors, Sasame Tsuji
Tales of Zestiria the X, Handmaiden

2017
Sakura Quest, Ririko Oribe
Kino's Journey, Child
Puzzle & Dragons X, Student

2019
A Certain Magical Index III, Boy
Hi Score Girl, Employee

2020
Love Live! Nijigasaki High School Idol Club, Rina Tennoji
Warlords of Sigrdrifa, Child
The Day I Became A God, Staff member

2021
The Duke of Death and His Maid, Maid B
Blue Reflection Ray, Maid B

2022
Love Live! Nijigasaki High School Idol Club 2nd Season, Rina Tennoji
The Little Lies We All Tell, Rikka

Video games 
2019
Love Live! School Idol Festival All Stars, Rina Tennoji

References

External links
 Official agency profile 
 

Living people
Japanese video game actresses
Japanese voice actresses
Nijigasaki High School Idol Club members
Voice actresses from Shizuoka Prefecture
1994 births